For the musician, see Paul Brunelle.

Paule Brunelle (born August 21, 1953) is a Canadian politician. She was the Bloc Québécois member of the House of Commons of Canada from the riding of Trois-Rivières from 2004 to 2011. She was the Bloc critic on Intergovernmental Affairs and Industry. Born in Trois-Rivières, Quebec, Brunelle is a businesswoman and an executive director.

External links
 
 How'd They Vote?: Paule Brunelle's voting history and quotes

1953 births
Bloc Québécois MPs
Businesspeople from Quebec
Women members of the House of Commons of Canada
French Quebecers
Living people
Members of the House of Commons of Canada from Quebec
People from Trois-Rivières
Women in Quebec politics
21st-century Canadian politicians
21st-century Canadian women politicians